Church of the Immaculate Conception of Blessed Virgin Mary is a historic church on FM 2672 in St. Mary's, Texas.

It was built in 1896 and added to the National Register in 1983.

See also

National Register of Historic Places listings in Lavaca County, Texas

References

Roman Catholic churches in Texas
Churches on the National Register of Historic Places in Texas
Carpenter Gothic church buildings in Texas
Roman Catholic churches completed in 1896
19th-century Roman Catholic church buildings in the United States
Churches in Lavaca County, Texas
National Register of Historic Places in Lavaca County, Texas